Sean McCormack is a former United States Assistant Secretary of State.

Sean or Shaun McCormack may refer to:

Sean McCormack (Gaelic footballer)
Sean McCormack (sound editor)
Shaun McCormack, biographer of Cool Papa Bell